Piala Emas Raja–Raja is an amateur annual football competition held between the states in Malaysia. It is a competition contested among Malay origin players in the states of Malaysia. The competition is managed by the Persatuan Bolasepak Melayu Malaysia (PBMM).

The competition has been held for a long time and the first known recorded champions was Perak in 1927.

Piala Agong will also be competed as an opening match of the current season of the Piala Emas Raja-Raja where the previous year winners of Piala Emas Raja-Raja will compete against the previous year winners of Piala Agong where they will be defending their trophy.

History 
The competition was first held in the year 1922 during the visit of His Royal Highness the Regent of England (Prince of Wales) to the east including Malaya and Singapore. Various celebrations were held including Malay Football Tournament sponsored 'Malaya / Borneo Exhibition' held for two weeks in Singapore. 10 state teams that participated were from Singapore, Johor, Malacca, Negeri Sembilan, Selangor, Perak, Kedah, Penang, Terengganu and Kelantan. Meanwhile, Pahang and Perlis did not participate. During the final, Kedah beat Johor and emerged champion and received the first edition of Kings Gold Cup.

The winners for the 73rd edition, 2013 Piala Emas Raja–Raja is Perlis.

Champions and finalists

Performance by teams

Corporate sponsor 
 Malayan Agri-Horticultural Association (1926–1946)
 Puncak Niaga (2009–2010)
 Bank Mandiri (2011–2012)
 Proton (2013)
 GT Radial (2014)

See also 
 Malaysia Super League
 Malaysia Premier League
 Piala FA
 Malaysia Cup

References